The pygmy sea bass (Serraniculus pumilio) is a species of marine ray-finned fish, it is the only member of the monotypic genus Serraniculus which is classified under the subfamily Serraninae, one of three subfamilies in the family Serranidae, which also includes the anthias and groupers. It is found in the western Atlantic Ocean and the northern Gulf of Mexico from South Carolina south to the northern coasts of South America but is absent from the Bahamas and the West Indies. It is a synchronous hermaphrodite.

References

Serraninae
Fish described in 1952